Qanbarabad may refer to:

Qanbarabad, Alborz
Qanbarabad, Kohgiluyeh and Boyer-Ahmad
Qanbarabad, Qazvin
Qanbarabad, Razavi Khorasan
Qanbarabad, South Khorasan
Qanbarabad, Tehran